Coramba Nature Reserve is a protected nature reserve located near Coffs Harbour in the Mid North Coast region of New South Wales, Australia. It is one of the few remnants of low altitude sub tropical rainforest in the Clarence River valley. Founded in 1982 with the primary goal of protecting the remaining lowland rainforests. 

Common tree species include white booyong, Oliver's sassafras, jackwood, white walnut, red cedar, black apple, white cedar, yellow carabeen, water gum, and maiden's blush.

See also

 Protected areas of New South Wales

References 

Forests of New South Wales
Nature reserves in New South Wales